Mesophleps parvella is a moth of the family Gelechiidae. It is found in Malaysia (Brunei), Papua New Guinea and Australia (Queensland).

The forewings are greyish brown, sometimes tinged with yellow.

Etymology
The species name is derived from the Latin prefix parv- (meaning small) and the postfix -ellus and refers to this species being the smallest in the genus Mesophleps.

References

Moths described in 2012
Mesophleps